Sular Mani lawkachanthar Temple is located  at  Taunggyi , Shan State . The Temple is proportionally built as like the original Ananda Temple that were worshiped by of King Kyanzittha of the Pagan Dynasty.

References

Buddhist temples in Myanmar
1105 establishments in Asia
Religious buildings and structures completed in 1105
12th-century Buddhist temples
Shan State
Buddhist pilgrimage sites in Myanmar